Stane Sever (20 November 1914 – 18 December 1970) was a Slovenian actor. He appeared in more than twenty films from 1947 to 1969.

Selected filmography

References

External links 

1914 births
1970 deaths
Slovenian male film actors
Actors from Ljubljana
Golden Arena winners